Terreton is an unincorporated agricultural community in Jefferson County, Idaho, United States.  It is located at an altitude of 4,790 feet, east of Mud Lake.  The ZIP Code for Terreton is 83450.

References

External links
idaho town locator
Terreton

Unincorporated communities in Jefferson County, Idaho
Unincorporated communities in Idaho